The Sanremo Music Festival 1972 was the 22nd annual Sanremo Music Festival, held at the Sanremo Casino in Sanremo, province of Imperia between 24 and 26 February 1972. It was broadcast by Rai 1 and was the last edition to be broadcast in black and white.

The show was presented by  Mike Bongiorno, assisted by actors Sylva Koscina and  Paolo Villaggio. Vittorio Salvetti served as artistic director. From this edition it was abolished the  competition rule, established in 1959, which prescribed a double performance by two different artists or groups for every song.
  
The winner of the Festival was Nicola Di Bari with the song "I giorni dell'arcobaleno", and according to the rules of this edition he was subsequently chosen to represent Italy at the Eurovision 1972.

Participants and results

References 

Sanremo Music Festival by year
1972 in Italian music
1972 music festivals